"Why" is a song by American R&B group 3T featuring their uncle Michael Jackson. It was written by Kenneth "Babyface" Edmonds and Jackson, who also produced it. The song was released as the fourth single from the group's debut album, Brotherhood (1995). It was originally selected to be part of Jackson's ninth studio album HIStory: Past, Present and Future, Book I (1995), but it was taken out and Jackson decided to give it away to his nephews. "Why" was well received on European and Asian music charts.

Critical reception
British magazine Music Week rated the song five out of five, adding, "This smoochy soul ballad bringing together the family is a dead cert for the top three, with the older Jackson's vocals making it possible number one material."

Music video
A music video was produced to promote the single. It features 3T and Jackson and is shot in black and white. The music video was released on the Michael Jackson's box set, Michael Jackson's Vision.

Track listing
 CD single
 "Why" (Radio Edit) - 4:10
 "Didn't Mean to Hurt You" ('96) - 4:30

 CD single #2
 "Why" (Radio Edit) - 4:10
 "Tease Me" (Single Edit) - 4:25

 CD maxi
 "Why" (Radio Edit) - 4:10
 "Tease Me" (Single Edit) - 4:25
 "Didn't Mean To Hurt You" - 5:45
 "What Will It Take" - 5:16

 CD maxi #2
 "Why" (Album Version) - 5:28
 "Tease Me" (Todd Terry's Tease Club Mix) - 6:49
 "Tease Me" (Todd Terry's TNT Tease Dub) - 6:11
 "Tease Me" (Acapella) - 4:40

Charts

Weekly charts

Year-end charts

Certifications

References

External links
 

1995 songs
1996 singles
3T songs
Michael Jackson songs
Epic Records singles
Pop ballads
Contemporary R&B ballads
Vocal collaborations
Song recordings produced by Michael Jackson
Songs written by Babyface (musician)
Black-and-white music videos
Songs written by Michael Jackson